Burenda  may refer to:

 Burenda, Queensland, Australia
 Burenda (character), a Lady!! character
 Burenda Gurishiini, a Galaxy Angel character

See also

 Brenda (disambiguation)